Norberto Azqueta Sr. (born 1930) is a Cuban-born American businessman, with interests in sugar, banking, paper and other industries.

Early life
Norberto Azqueta is the son of Jésus Azqueta, who owned a sugar mill in Venezuela through the family company Trucane Sugar. His family is of Spanish descent.

Career

Azqueta moved to the U.S after the rise of the Castro regime in Cuba in 1960.

Azqueta is one of the founders of the Gulfstream Polo Club in Lake Worth, Florida.

Personal life
Azqueta is married to Lian Fanjul Azqueta, the daughter of Cuban-born American sugar baron Alfonso Fanjul Sr.

In 2001, his eldest son, Norberto Azqueta Jr., born in Cuba, who was then working for the Fanjul brothers' sugar-making conglomerate, Florida Crystals, married Robin van Orman, the great granddaughter of Burton K. Wheeler, a U.S. senator from 1923 to 1947.

Their son Jesse Azqueta Sr. married Winnie, and they have a son Jesus Azqueta Jr., who married Rachel C. Eggen in Palm Beach in 2012.

References

1930 births
Living people
Cuban emigrants to the United States
Cuban businesspeople
Businesspeople from Florida
Fanjul family